John Moffitt is an American television director who is best known for his work on Mr. Show. Moffitt won an Emmy Award in 1977 for his work in the category of Outstanding Achievement in Coverage of Special Events - Individuals for the 28th Primetime Emmy Awards. He is a graduate of Dartmouth College.

Filmography
Talking Funny (TV movie) 2011
Colin Quinn: Long Story Short (TV movie) 2011
Ricky Gervais: Out of England 2 - The Stand-Up Special (TV documentary) 2010
Tracy Morgan: Black and Blue (TV movie) 2010
Bill Maher: But I'm Not Wrong (TV movie) 2010
Jim Jefferies: I Swear to God (TV movie) 2009
Cheech & Chong: Roasted (TV special) 2009
Ricky Gervais: Out of England - The Stand-Up Special (TV documentary) 2008
Dana Carvey: Squatting Monkeys Tell No Lies (TV movie) 2008
Bill Maher: The Decider (TV movie) 2007
The Hollow Men (TV series) 2005
Bill Maher: Victory Begins at Home (TV movie) 2003
Mr. Show with Bob and David (TV series) 1995-1998
Mr. Show and the Incredible, Fantastical News Report (TV movie)1998
Mr. Vegas All-Night Party Starring Drew Carey (TV movie) 1997
Bill Maher: The Golden Goose Special (TV movie) 1997
Saturday Night Special (TV series)1996
Mr. Show with Bob and David: Fantastic Newness (TV movie) 1996
Bill Maher: Stuff That Struck Me Funny (TV movie) 1995
50 Years of Soaps: An All-Star Celebration (TV movie)1995
One Night Stand (TV series) 1992
Say What? (TV movie) 1992
Penn & Teller: Don't Try This at Home! (TV movie) 1990
50 Years of Television: A Golden Celebration (TV documentary)1989
Not Necessarily the News (TV series) 1984-1988
Live! From London (TV special)
Love at Stake 1987
I Comic Relief (TV special) 1986
Catch a Rising Star's 10th Anniversary (TV special) 1982
Fridays (TV series) 1980-1982
The 31st Annual Emmy Awards (TV special)1979
Ringling Bros, Barnum and Bailey Circus Special (TV movie) 1979
The Captain and Tennille in Hawaii (TV special)1978
The Richard Pryor Show (TV series)1977
The Richard Pryor Special? (TV movie)1977
The 4th Annual American Music Awards (TV special) 1977
Van Dyke and Company (TV series) 1976
The 28th Annual Primetime Emmy Awards (TV special)1976
The Second Annual Comedy Awards (TV movie)1976
Wide World Mystery (TV series)1975
The Werewolf of Woodstock 1975 
Andy Williams Presents (TV movie) 1974
Chicago in the Rockies (ABC TV Special) Dick Clark Productions
Don't Call Me Mama Anymore (TV special)1973
The Burns and Schreiber Comedy Hour (TV series) 1973
Roberta Flack: The First Time Ever (TV movie)1973
Mitzi... The First Time (TV movie) 1973
The Ice Palace (TV series) 1971
The Great Santa Claus Switch (TV movie)1970
Our Place (TV series) 1967
The Ed Sullivan Show (TV series) 1948–1971 (1068 episodes)

External links

 

American television directors
Living people
Year of birth missing (living people)